The Camden London Borough Council in London, England is elected every four years. Since the last boundary changes in 2002, 54 councillors have been elected from 18 wards.

Political control
Since 1964, political control of the council has been held by the following parties:

Throughout most of its history, Camden has been controlled outright by the Labour Party. During that control, Labour's share of the seats has fluctuated significantly. The below chart includes only councillors, not aldermen prior to their abolition in 1978; the presence of aldermen never affected the overall control of the council.

Leadership
The leaders of the council have been:

Council elections

Result maps

Electoral wards

Electoral wards were established for Camden when it came into existence on 1 April 1965. The first elections of ward councillors took place in 1964. These boundaries were also used for the 1968, 1971 and 1974 elections. For the 1978 elections the ward boundaries were revised in Camden. These boundaries were then also used at the 1982, 1986 and 1990 elections.

For the May 1994 elections there were some minor adjustments to London borough boundaries, which caused some Camden wards to have small changes in area and population. These boundaries were also used at the 1998 elections. The current ward boundaries came into effect at the May 2002 elections. They were also used at the 2006, 2010, 2014 and 2018 elections.

Camden was subject to a boundary review in 2020. In February 2020, The Local Government Boundary Commission for England released its final recommendations that the borough should be divided into 15 three-member wards and 5 two-member wards. The wards were approved by Parliament in October 2020, and will first be used for the 2022 election.

By-election results

1964–1968

The by-election was called following the resignation of Cllr Alexander Sullivan.

The by-election was called following the resignation of Cllr Richard Rowe.

The by-election was called following the death of Cllr Sidney Munn.

The by-election was called following the resignation of Cllr Hilda Chandler.

1968–1971

The by-election was called following the death of Cllr Jonny Johnson.

The by-election was called following the resignation of Cllr Peter Brooke.

The by-election was called following the resignation of Cllr Alan Greengross.

1971–1974
 

The by-election was called following the resignation of Cllr John Eidenow.

 

The by-election was called following the death of John Keohane.

The by-election was called following the resignation of Cllr John Needham.

1974–1978

The by-election was called following the resignation of Cllr Richard Arthur.

The by-election was called following the resignation of Cllr Brian Loughran.

The by-election was called following the resignation of Cllr Archie MacDonald.

The by-election was called following the resignation of Cllr Frank Dobson.

 

The by-election was called following the resignation of Cllr John Toomey.

 

The by-election was called following the resignation of Cllr Ronald Raymond-Cox.

1978–1982

The by-election was called following the death of Cllr Donald Degerdon.

The by-election was called following the resignation of Cllr Brian Stoner.

The by-election was called following the resignation of Cllr Anthony Beaton.

The by-election was called following the resignation of Cllr Richard Almond.

The by-election was called following the resignation of Cllr Michael Morrissey.

The by-election was called following the resignation of Cllr Christopher Gardiner.

The by-election was called following the resignation of Cllr Jonathan Sofer.

The by-election was called following the resignation of Cllr Roderick Cordara.

The by-election was called following the resignation of Cllr Kevin Gould.

1982–1986

The by-election was called following the resignation of Cllr Derek Spencer.

The by-election was called following the resignation of Cllr Teresa Ryan.

The by-election was called following the resignation of Cllr John Mills.

1986–1990

The by-election was called following the death of Cllr Thomas Devine.

The by-election was called following the resignation of Cllr Stephen Moon.

The by-election was called following the resignation of Cllr Stephen Bevington.

The by-election was called following the resignation of Cllr Selina Gee.

1990–1994

The by-election was called following the death of Cllr Alfred Saunders.

The by-election was called following the resignation of Cllr Vaughan A. Emsley.

The by-election was called following the resignation of Cllr John M. Wakeham.

The by-election was called following the resignation of Cllr Julia O. Devote.

The by-election was called following the resignation of Cllr Simon C. J. McDonald.

The by-election was called following the resignation of Cllr Mary C. Helsdon.

1994–1998

The by-election was called following the resignation of Cllr Peter G. Day.

The by-election was called following the resignation of Cllr Shelley Burke.

1998–2002

The by-election was called following the resignation of Cllr Mary Ryan.

The by-election was called following the death of Cllr Julian J. Tobin.

The by-election was called following the resignation of Cllr Jake Turnbull.

The by-election was called following the resignation of Cllr Pamela Chesters.

2002–2006

The by-election was called following the resignation of Cllr Justin Barnard.

The by-election was called following the resignation of Cllr John K. Dickie.

2006–2010

The by-election was called following the resignation of Cllr Lucy N. Anderson.

The by-election was called following the resignation of Cllr Roy E. Shaw.

The by-election was called following the death of Cllr Jane Schopflin.

The by-election was called following the resignation of Cllr Paul J. Barton.

The by-election was called following the resignation of Cllr Mike Greene.

The by-election was called following the resignation of Cllr Philip Thompson.

The by-election was called following the resignation of Cllr Christopher J. Basson.

2010–2014

The by-election was called following the death of Cllr Martin J. Davies.

The by-election was called following the death of Cllr Dave Horan.

The by-election was called following the resignation of Cllr Michael Nicolaides.

 

The by-election was called following the resignation of Cllr Thomas Neumark.

The by-election was called following the resignation of Cllr Ms. Kirsty Roberts.

The by-election was called following the resignation of Cllr Sean Birch. Percentage change is since May 2010.

2014–2018

The by-election was called following the death of Cllr Peter Brayshaw. Percentage change is since May 2014.

The by-election was called following the resignation of Cllr Simon Marcus. Percentage change is since May 2014.

The by-election was called following the resignation of Cllr Maeve McCormack.

The by-election was called following the resignation of Cllr Theo Blackwell.

2018–2022

The by-election was called following the resignation of Cllr Abi Wood.

 
 

 

The by-election was called following the resignation of Cllr Flick Rea.

2022–present

The by-election was called following the resignation of Cllr Adrian Cohen.

Aldermen 
Aldermen were elected by the council, not the electorate, and had full voting rights. Each council included aldermen, to a maximum of one sixth of the councillors. The Local Government Act 1972 abolished Aldermen with voting rights with effect from 1978 in the London borough councils. Since 1978, the title has been used in an honorary capacity.

1964–1968

1968–1971

1971–1974

1974–1978

Honorary Aldermen 
Since 1978, the title has been used in an honorary capacity and enables the holder to attend civic events and walk ahead of councillors at the annual Remembrance Day parade. The title has been awarded to former councillors, including:

 Roy Shaw (awarded in 2007, the borough's first Honorary Alderman, for 51 years of unbroken service in the Metropolitan Borough of Hampstead, Metropolitan Borough of St Pancras and on Camden Council)

 Flick Rea (awarded in 2022, for the longest continuous service, 35 years, as a Liberal Democrat councillor, the party's first honorary alderman)

 Roger Robinson (awarded in 2022, served as a Labour councillor for 38 years, the longest on record for any councillor)

Notes

References

 By-election results

External links
 Camden Council